Haiyang Township is a township under the administration of Lingchuan County, Guangxi, China. , it administers Haiyang Residential Community and the following 13 villages:
Haiyang Village
Jiangwei Village
Guoqing Village
Jiulian Village
Damiaotang Village
Shuitou Village
Yaole Village
Datangbian Village
Xinmin Village
Xiaopingle Village
Bindong Village
Si'antou Village
Antai Village

References 

Townships of Guilin
Lingchuan County, Guangxi